Statistics of DPR Korea Football League in the 2014 season.

Overview
The 2014 edition of the Highest Class Football League championship was played as a single round robin; twelve teams took part, each playing eleven games. Hwaebul won the championships, having had 7 wins, 3 draws and 1 loss. April 25 were the runners-up, and Amrokkang finished third. The three teams that finished in the top three spots had been considered the favourites before the start of the competition; Sŏnbong, Wŏlmido, and Kwanmobong had not been expected to do well, but each scored surprising upset victories over stronger opponents.

Table (partial results)

Clubs

Cup competitions

Man'gyŏngdae Prize
The 2014 edition of the Man'gyŏngdae Prize was played as a single round-robin tournament, followed by a single-elimination play-off stage. The final was held on 14 May 2014, and April 25 defeated Amrokkang 1–0. Kigwancha defeated Sobaeksu 1–0 in the third place match.

Poch'ŏnbo Torch Prize
The 2014 tournament for the Poch'ŏnbo Torch Prize was played in two stages, the first being a double round-robin league phase, followed by a single-elimination play-off phase. The top four finishers in the league phase qualified for the semi-finals. The final was played on 28 August, in which April 25 defeated the defending champion Hwaebul by a score of 1–0.

References

DPR Korea Football League seasons
1
Korea
Korea